This is a list of Ancestral Puebloan dwellings in Utah, United States.

Locations

See also 
 History of Utah
 List of the oldest buildings in Utah

References 

Houses in Utah
Lists of buildings and structures in Utah
Utah
Native American-related lists
Religious places of the indigenous peoples of North America